The Vesuvius red zone is the area designated to be quickly evacuated within a few days in the case of an eruption of Mount Vesuvius. The authorities believe that they will have two weeks' warning of an imminent eruption; the questions that arise are whether the population can be evacuated in time, despite a reluctance to leave their homes; and if there be as much as two weeks' warning in reality.

As the area around Mount Vesuvius is highly urbanized, it became necessary to develop evacuation plans to be applied when the signs of a forthcoming eruption appear. A danger zone around the volcano was first identified in 2001 by the Italian ; its boundaries were then redefined in 2013 following new studies on the behaviour of Plinian eruptions.

The zone is composed by two subzones, called red zone 1 and 2. The former is the most dangerous area in the case of an eruption, being at greatest risk from pyroclastic flows. The red zone 2 will be subjected to falling ash and lapilli, whose intensity will depend on the intensity and direction of the winds at the time.

Mount Vesuvius is continuously kept under surveillance by the Vesuvius Observatory of the National Institute of Geophysics and Volcanology. When an appointed set of geologic activities occurs, an eruption warning is issued and the evacuation procedure begins. It has been estimated that 72 hours are needed to complete the evacuation: 12 hours to organize it, 48 hours to transfer all the people outside the red zone and 12 hours are kept as a safety margin for unexpected events.

List of comunes involved 
The red zone comprises 25 comunes and part of the city of Naples, with about 800,000 residents to be evacuated.

In the case of an eruption, the evacuated people will be transferred to and hosted in 19 Italian regions (Campania being excluded), according to their comune of origin.

See also 

 Emergency evacuation
 Emergency management
 Vesuvius National Park
 Pompeii and Herculaneum
 Prediction of volcanic activity

References

External links 
 

Mount Vesuvius
Emergency management